Myoscolex is an early animal species known from the Cambrian Emu Bay Shale in South Australia. It was interpreted as an annelid and some supports that theory, while it was also considered as an arthropod close to Opabinia, through other studies questions that interpretation. Myoscolex is the earliest known example of phosphotized muscle tissue, and as to which shows distinct annulation.

Etymology 
Myoscolex ateles derives its name from Greek, "Myo-" meaning muscle, "Scolex" meaning worm, and "Ateles" meaning incomplete. This definition of "Incomplete muscle worm" is due to its initial identification as a "muscular" annelid worm with indistinct features after fossilization.

Description

As an Opabiniid 
When described as an Opabiniid, Myoscolex is said to have at least 3 eyes, a thin proboscis jutting from under the proposed eyes, lateral lobes on the trunk, a tail fan on the posterior segments, and an upwardly curving trunk. It would have lived as a fast nektonic carnivore. However in 2022, new opabiniid Utaurora was described and Myoscolex is considered as animal with unknown affinity.

As a Polychaete 
Myoscolex as a polychaete worm was unconventional in appearance being laterally flattened body with "rods" protruding from the ventral side. Movement would have been an undulation similar to that of Pikaia, and without the use of chaetae for propulsion, unlike other polychaetes.

Preservation 
Myoscolex was preserved laterally compressed and in 4 layers. The outer two layers are composed of calcium carbonate and represents the skin, rods, lateral lobes, and possibly eyes and proboscis. The inner two layers were the internal muscles mineralized in apatite in resounding detail.

References

Prehistoric protostome genera
Prehistoric invertebrates of Oceania
Controversial taxa
Emu Bay Shale